The Little Flock hymnbook is in common use amongst Exclusive Brethren in various editions which nevertheless derive from a common source. It exists in almost as many variations and editions as there are distinct groups of Exclusive Brethren.

Early history 

In 1838 (and again 1840) the Central Tract Depot published George Wigram's Hymns for the Poor of the Flock. This was followed in 1856 by his Hymns and Spiritual Songs for the Little Flock which gathered together hymns from diverse collections used among Brethren and on which all subsequent versions are based. This was revised in 1881 by John Nelson Darby, an edition which is still in print, published by Bible Truth Publishers of Addison, Illinois, USA and available from Chapter Two, etc. William Kelly revised the hymn book in 1894 and Thomas Henry Reynolds produced his edition in 1903.

Raven/Taylor editions 

Amongst Raven–Taylor Brethren, every new doctrinal development has been reflected in renewed activity in hymn composition in English and other European languages. Doctrinal shifts were often followed by marked re-editing of the hymns themselves to bring them into line with current ministry which often necessitated the production of a new edition. The main editions are 1903, 1932, 1951, 1962, and 1973, of which there is a Taylor/Symington (1973 Amendment) edition and a separate Kingston Bible Trust (1973 Re-Selection) edition. From the 1940s, foreign language editions were gradually brought into line with English editions so that Brethren could, where possible, sing together the same hymns in the same metre. The 1962 hymnbook thus appears in varying quality in 10 or more languages. The Swedish editions in particular have a long tradition of translating English hymns, especially gospel songs for outreach. The English editions themselves have included translations from Swedish, French, Spanish and German. Taylor/Symington/Hales Brethren use their English hymnbook universally regardless of the local language.

A new edition, Hymns and Spiritual Songs for the Flock of God, was published in New Zealand in 2001 by R.D. Church and E.J. Forrest through the Joseph Bywater Trust. This collection is based on the 1951 edition and gathers together many hymns from all the pre-existing collections, restoring hymns to their original wording where possible and adding some new compositions.

Kelly/Lowe/Glanton editions

The KLG grouping have had two major hymn books since William Kelly's Hymns Selected and Revised in 1894 edition. Following the reunion of 'Kelly' (1894 users) and 'Lowe' Brethren (1881 users) in 1926, the 1928 edition was compiled by William John Hocking and is still in use by a few 'Kelly' and Open Brethren meetings. The 1978 edition followed the 1974 reunion with both 'Glanton' Brethren (1903 users) and 'Grant' Brethren (1881 users) and is used by these "reunited" Brethren. This latter book has drawn more widely from hymns in common use but does not contain hymns addressing the Holy Spirit in line with traditional Darbyite teaching. Foreign language editions have developed and continued in their own distinctive traditions.

Gospel hymnbooks 

Gospel hymnbooks have been produced by most branches of Exclusive Brethren. The Little Flock editions have always contained a selection of gospel hymns, but both Raven/Taylor and KLG wings of the movement have from time to time used separate (sometimes privately printed) collections of gospel hymns in the gospel and outreach meetings. Chapter Two have re-published The Evangelists' Hymnal, edited by Walter Thomas Prideaux Wolston. This book is used by some Glanton and some Open Brethren assemblies.

Tune books 

Little Flock Tune Books have been published in 1883, 1904, 1932, 1954, 1965, and 1979. Charles Theodore Lambert's edition of 1932 published both words and tunes with an appendix "Containing a few hymns suitable for the Christian Household". It is still published in Tonic Sol-Fa by the Symington/Hales Depot. The other Tune Books had tunes only, listed in metrical order. The KLG 1978 hymn book and the Gospel Hymn Book were both published with a music edition. All editions (but especially the 1965 edition) have drawn on Exclusive Brethren tunewriters and musicians to produce collections of a high calibre both in terms of musical editing and in the quality of the compositions themselves. Composers of note include Thomas Willey, T. Collins, Miss Marian La Thangue, Miss S.M. Walker, Charles Leflaive, C.T. Lambert, Benjamin Christiansen, R.A. Evershed, Peter S. Pope, Eric Carrén, John F. Harvey, and Gordon Millar.

Historical and critical apparatus 
An Access database of all first lines and metres of hymns with limited biographical and bibliographical material is held at the Christian Brethren Archive in the John Rylands University Library, Manchester.

Gordon Rainbow has collated some historical material on the Little Flock Hymnbook. This contains links to all the prefaces to the early hymnbooks and from 1903 follows the Raven/Taylor line of hymnbooks. Various accounts of new editions of the hymnbook were published and these are given in full.

An account of all the major developments in the tradition was published in Frank Wallace's The History of the Little Flock Hymnbook (it does maintain an anti-Taylor bias). Also by Frank Wallace, Spiritual Songsters contains biographies of many hymnwriters found in the Little Flock tradition and is published by Chapter Two.

Adrian Roach wrote a History of the 1881 edition containing much biographical information on the hymnwriters. It is published by Bible Truth Publishers.  From the same publisher, lyrics and audio of many of the hymns are freely available at BTP's Little Flock section. 

Edwin O.P. Mutton compiled a History of the "Little Flock Hymn Book" and its Authors, containing biographical information on all authors 1856–1962, and a historical section covering details of revisions of the same time period.  It is published by Saville Street Distribution, and is also available at Bibles-Etc.  It was initially printed in 2018, and revised in October 2020.  

A text of the 1978 Kelly/Lowe/Glanton edition is available online where there is a large amount of biographical material and a first line index of the 1881 "Darby" edition.

List of English editions

Scandinavian editions

Spanish editions

German editions

See also
List of English-language hymnals by denomination

Notes and references 
 STEM Publishing has the 1881 edition available online, with words and music.

Protestant hymnals
Plymouth Brethren

da:Salmebog
no:Salmebok
nn:Salmebok
sv:Lista över psalmböcker